Emmanuilovka is a rural locality in Bolsheugonsky Selsoviet Rural Settlement, Lgovsky District, Kursk Oblast, Russia. Population:

Geography 
The village is located on the Penka River (a left tributary of the Seym), 42 km from the Russia–Ukraine border, 55 km south-west of Kursk, 14 km south-east of the district center – the town Lgov, 4 km from the selsoviet center – Bolshiye Ugony.

 Climate
Emmanuilovka has a warm-summer humid continental climate (Dfb in the Köppen climate classification).

Transport 
Emmanuilovka is located 4 km from the road of regional importance  (Kursk – Lgov – Rylsk – border with Ukraine) as part of the European route E38, 6 km from the road  (Lgov – Sudzha), 2.5 km from the road of intermunicipal significance  (38K-004 – Lyubimovka – Imeni Karla Libknekhta), on the road  (38K-017 – Emmanuilovka – Stremoukhovo-Bobrik), 5 km from the nearest railway halt 408 km (railway line Lgov I — Kursk).

The rural locality is situated 62 km from Kursk Vostochny Airport, 128 km from Belgorod International Airport and 263 km from Voronezh Peter the Great Airport.

References

Notes

Sources

Rural localities in Lgovsky District